The Quantico Marines Devil Dogs football team represented the Quantico Marine Base in the sport of American football, playing 51 seasons between 1919 and 1972. Composed of United States Marine Corps personnel, many of whom had college football experience, the team competed primarily against other military teams and college teams, along with an annual game against the Baltimore City Fire Department from 1929 to 1942. The Devil Dogs registered wins against college programs such as Georgetown, Rutgers, and Villanova, and were the only team to score a touchdown against the undefeated 1923 Michigan Wolverines.

History 

The "Devil Dogs" football program began after World War I, encouraged by Marine Corps General Smedley Butler, for whom the team's stadium was later named. Head coach Lt. John Beckett led the team to back-to-back undefeated seasons in 1921 and 1922. Before a crowd of 16,000 in Baltimore in 1921, the Marines defeated the Third Army Corps, who were coached by Major Dwight D. Eisenhower, by a score of 20–0. Frank Goettge was the backfield star of the 1921 team. Walter Camp, after seeing Goettge play against the Third Army Corps one year, wrote: "Today, for today at least, I saw my greatest all-time football player; for today at least greater than Jim Thorpe on a good day. The big fellow's name is Frank Goettge. He is a young Marine Lieutenant from Ohio." Goettge, who rose to the rank of lieutenant colonel, would die on Guadalcanal in 1942. The major highlights of the 1922 season were a 9–6 victory over Georgetown, an Eastern power at the time, and a 13–12 victory over Third Army Corps. The game with Third Army Corps was held in Baltimore before 50,000 fans including 12,000 Marines, the Secretaries of War and the Navy, Governors of Pennsylvania, Maryland and Virginia and 100 members of Congress.

The Marines saw their winning streak end with a 6–0 loss to VMI in the 1923 season opener. Quantico would only lose one other game during the season, a 26–6 defeat at Michigan. "Support for the team reached an all-time high during a game against the University of Michigan at Ann Arbor, during the Corps’ anniversary in 1923. Thousands of Marines and fans traveled from Quantico on special trains to attend the game. Many of the Marines spent their entire month's paycheck and more just to pay for the venture." A "mixup in the official timekeeper's record" resulted in the first quarter lasting 33 minutes, thus the first half was 48 minutes long rather than a regulation 30 minutes. Despite the two losses, the 1923 team shutout six teams during the season, including a 39–0 victory over Villanova.

The Marines improved in 1924, winning each of their games except for a 13–13 tie with Vanderbilt. This would prove to be Beckett's last year coaching the Marines. In four seasons, they were 30–2–2 for a  winning percentage. Tom Keady took over the head coaching duties for the 1925 season, but Quantico didn't fare as well, finishing with a 6–3–1 record. But Keady would return the Marines to the ranks of the undefeated, coaching the team to a 10–0 record in 1927. Keady compiled a 45–12–3 record ( winning percentage) as head coach from 1925 to 1930.

From 1931 through 1942, the team had multiple head coaches, with only Bill Beatty serving as head coach for more than a single season, in 1935 and 1936. Statistically, the best season of this era was 1934, when the team was 7–1, losing only to the Sewanee Athletic Club. Due to World War II, no team was fielded during 1943–1945. When competition resumed in 1946, the team went 3–8 while playing mainly against other military teams. In 1947, the team improved to 12–1 while again playing mostly against military teams, losing only to Washington and Lee in the first game of the season.

The Marines had another undefeated season in 1948 (13–0), including shutouts over eight teams. A 27-game winning streak would end in 1949, with a 29–7 loss to Xavier. Xavier would win a 34–13 rematch in 1950, but one highlight of the season was a 61–21 win over the VPI Gobblers (now known as the Virginia Tech Hokies) with the Devil Dogs led by Eddie LeBaron at quarterback. The 1956 squad would not only beat Xavier (27–13), but also Boston College (20–6), en route to a 9–3 record. The 1958 Marines pulled off an upset of 9–0 Rutgers (ranked No. 19), 13–12. Coach Capt. Will Overgaard led the Marines to an 11–0 record in 1959, the last undefeated season for Quantico. The 1962 season would see five games canceled because of the Cuban Missile Crisis, and two games were canceled in 1963 because of the assassination of President Kennedy. In the 1965 season finale at Butler Stadium, Quantico (a two-touchdown underdog) pulled off an upset of Memphis State, 20–14.

In 1972, Quantico would play their last season of football, under head coach Ron Eckert. The Marines beat Akron (24–0) late in the season, and Xavier (34–0) in the season finale to finish with an 8–4 record. The program was discontinued by General Robert E. Cushman, Commandant of the Marine Corps, who stated that "continued personnel and financial support for football could not be justified" due to rising costs.

Yearly records

Source:

Military titles

Source:

Military bowl games
The Devil Dogs are known to have participated in six military bowl games, with a record of 4–2.

Notable personnel

Multiple players and coaches with the team ultimately became general officers in the Marine Corps, including:
 Chester R. Allen (tackle 1930)
 Caleb Bailey (center 1923–1926; assistant coach 1928–1929)
 Joseph C. Burger (tackle 1925–1926, 1931; assistant coach 1928, 1931–1932)
 William S. Fellers (back 1922–1923)
 Harry B. Liversedge (end 1920; tackle 1921–1924; assistant coach 1925–1926, 1929)
 George R. E. Shell (end 1932; athletic officer 1937)
 Austin Shofner (head coach 1946)
 William J. Whaling (end 1922–1923)
 Frederick L. Wieseman (assistant coach 1936)

Source:

Notes

References

 
American football teams established in 1919
American football teams disestablished in 1972
1919 establishments in Virginia
1972 disestablishments in Virginia